Herbert Newell Bate was Dean of York between 1932 and 1941.

Born in 1871 into a clerical family, he was educated at St Paul's and Trinity College, Oxford and ordained in 1896. He was a Tutor of Keble College, Oxford until 1897 when he became a Fellow at Magdalen College, Oxford and Dean of Divinity. He held incumbencies at St Stephen's Hampstead and Christ Church, Lancaster Gate before 8 years as a Canon at Carlisle Cathedral. He was Rector of Hadleigh, Suffolk and Dean  of Bocking, Essex until his appointment to York. An eminent author, he died on 18 May 1941.

Neuroscientist Mike Bate is his grandson (son of Herbert Bate's elder son, John Gordon Bate, M.B. Ch.B., an R.A.F. doctor, of Holmbury St Mary, Dorking).

References

External links
 

20th-century English Anglican priests
1871 births
People educated at St Paul's School, London
Alumni of Trinity College, Oxford
Deans of York
1941 deaths
Deans of Bocking